The periodisation of the history of Belize is the division of Belizean, Mayan, and Mesoamerican history into named blocks of time, spanning the arrival of Palaeoindians to the present time. The pre-Columbian era is most often periodised by Mayanists, who often employ four or five periods to discuss history prior to the arrival of Spaniards. The Columbian era is most often periodised by historians, and less often by Mayanists, who often employ at least four periods to discuss history up to the present time.

Columbian

Periods 
The Columbian era of Belizean history is most often divided into four periods, ie the Spanish, Precolonial, Colonial, and Sovereign, all preceded by a portion of the pre-Columbian Postclassic period extending past 1492. These are most often defined or characterised in terms of distinguishing events occurring between each period, ie events separating one period from another, and less often in terms of distinguishing events, trends, or milestones occurring within each period. Generally, there has been less attention paid to the periodisation of the Columbian era of Belizean history, as opposed to its pre-Columbian era, resulting in broad concordance between the upper and lower bounds employed for each period in scholarly literature.

Postclassic

Spanish 

Precolonial 
The Precolonial period is most often characterised as the time span running to the date on which the British settlement in the Bay of Honduras was granted a colonial charter, ie , or the date on which these letters patent were proclaimed, ie .

Colonial 
The Colonial period is most often characterised as the time span running to the passage of the Belize Act in UK Parliament, the Constitution Act in the Belizean Parliament, or the date on which said acts came into force, known as the day on which Belize gained sovereignty or independence from the UK, ie .

Sovereign 
The Sovereign ie Independent period is most often characterised as the time span running to the present.

Table

Graph

Table

Pre-Columbian

Periods 
Pre-Columbian Belizean, Mayan, and Mesoamerican history is most often divided into five periods, ie the Palaeoindian, Archaic, Preclassic, Classic, and Postclassic. These are most often defined or characterised in terms of distinguishing events or trends occurring within each period, rather than events occurring between each period (ie events separating one period from another). As a result, though the aforementioned sequence is well-established, and despite each period's characterisation being broadly agreed upon, various discordant upper and lower bounds have been employed for each period in scholarly literature, resulting in temporal overlaps and gaps between chronologies. Additionally, the events or trends used to characterise these periods are now known to have occurred at different times in different geographic regions, sub-regions, and settlements, rather than all-at-once across the Mayan region or Mesoamerica. This further adds to the discordance between chronologies employed in scholarly literature, as increasingly localised upper and lower bounds for sub-regional geographic entities are used (in preference to fixed or standardised regional start and end dates).

Preceramic 

The Preceramic period is most often characterised as the time span prior to the first appearance of ceramics in the relevant geographic region.

Palaeoindian 
The Palaeoindian ie Lithic period is most often characterised as the time span during which humans first peopled the Americas. Its start is, furthermore, commonly dated to modern humans' first arrival in the relevant geographic region.

Archaic 
The Archaic period is most often characterised as the time span during which non-nomadic farming settlements first appeared in the relevant geographic region.

Preclassic 

The Preclassic ie Formative period is most often characterised as the timespan during which socioeconomically complex societies or states first appeared across the relevant geographic region. It was prior thought of as the period which preceded the Classic culmination or florescence of Mayan civilisation, ie 'as a precursor to civilisation, but without the attributes of civilisation in its own right.'

Classic 
The Classic period is most often characterised as the time span during which the social, economic, political, artistic, and intellectual development of societies or states across the relevant geographic region first peaked or culminated.

Postclassic 
The Postclassic is most often characterised as the time span during which societies or states across the relevant geographic region underwent transformation or revival. It was prior thought of as the period which followed the Classic culmination or florescence of Mayan civilisation, ie 'as a decline from the Classic peak of civilisation, a time marked by decadence rather than [a Classic-like] era of continued development.'

Though the entire Palaeoindian-to-Postclassic time span is often characterised as pre-Columbian, the Postclassic is most often end dated after 1492.

Table

Graph

Table

See also 
 Periodisation of Mesoamerican history

Notes and references

Explanatory footnotes

Short citations

References

External links 

History of Belize by period
Periodization
History by period
Historical eras
Periods and stages in archaeology